In astrology, the royal stars of Persia are Aldebaran, Regulus, Antares and Fomalhaut. They were regarded as the guardians of the sky during the time of the Persian Empire (550 BC–330 BC) in the area of modern-day Iran. The Persians believed that the sky was divided into four districts with each district being guarded by one of the four Royal Stars. The stars were believed to hold both good and evil power and the Persians looked upon them for guidance in scientific calculations of the sky, such as the calendar and lunar/solar cycles, and for predictions.

The royal stars are mentioned in the Bundahishn, a collection of Zoroastrian cosmogony and cosmology.

History
The four stars with their modern names, and their ancient Persian names (in brackets) were: 
 Aldebaran (Tascheter) – vernal equinox (Watcher of the East)
 Regulus (Venant) – summer solstice (Watcher of the North)
 Antares (Satevis) – autumnal equinox (Watcher of the West)
 Fomalhaut (Haftorang/Hastorang) – winter solstice (Watcher of the South)

The four dominant stars have an apparent magnitude–1.5 or brighter. and are the brightest stars in their constellations and among the 25–brightest stars in the night sky.

In Babylonian and Assyrian times
In 747 BCE the Babylonian King Nabu-nasir adopted a calendar derived from the motions of the four stars, one following an eight-year cycle and one a nineteen-year cycle (later adopting the nineteen-year calendar as standard).

By 700 BCE the Assyrians had essentially mapped the ecliptic cycle because of the four stars and were in result able to map the constellations, distinguishing them from the planets and the fixed stars.

In Persia
By the time of the Persian Empire (550 BC–330 BC), Aldebaran watched the Eastern sky and was the dominant star in the Taurus constellation, Regulus watched the North and was the dominant star in the Leo constellation, Antares watched the West and was the alpha star in Scorpio, and Fomalhaut watched the Southern sky and was the brightest star in Piscis Austrinus (sharing the same longitude with the star Sadalmelik which is the predominant star in Aquarius). 

Aldebaran marked the vernal equinox and Antares marked the autumnal equinox, while Regulus marked the Summer Solstice and Fomalhaut the Winter Solstice. While watching the sky, the dominant star would appear in its season, each having a time of the year when most noticeable. Regulus was seen as the main star because it was in the constellation of Leo, giving it the power of the lion, signifying the strength of kings with large implications.

The constellations of the royal stars were said to be fixed because their positions were close to the four fixed points of the sun's path. The sun was then surrounded by four bright stars at the beginning of every season. From this observation individuals began to denote them the royal stars.

Uses
The royal stars were used primarily for navigation. They were also believed to govern events in the world. Major disasters, breakthroughs, and historical phenomenons were seen as caused by the stars and their alignment in the sky during the time in which the event occurred. When the stars were aligned accordingly, favourable conditions followed, and when they were negatively aligned, disaster was predicted. Because Regulus was the most influential of the royal stars, events that took place while Regulus was in dominance were amplified and grave, foreshadowing destruction, depending on what planet or planets might be in conjunction with the star.

Criticism 
The idea there existed four royal stars of Persia was analysed in a 1945 article in Popular Astronomy, where the idea was criticized as largely a relatively modern invention, and/or a misunderstanding of the original source texts.

See also
Archangel
Astrotheology
Four Dwarves (Norse mythology)
Four Heavenly Kings
Four Holy Beasts
Four Living Creatures
Four sons of Horus
Four Stags (Norse mythology)
Four Symbols
Four temperaments
Persian astronomy
Tetramorph

Notes

References

Further reading 
 
 
 

Calendars
History of astrology
Persian mythology
Stellar groupings
Technical factors of astrology